August Sprenk (also August Saluste; 1 October 1885 Mõniste Parish (now Rõuge Parish), Kreis Werro – 16 February 1942 Gorki Oblast, Russian SFSR) was an Estonian politician. He was a member of I Riigikogu, representing the Estonian Independent Socialist Workers' Party and of the III Riigikogu, representing the Estonian Workers' Party. He was a member of the Riigikogu since 22 June 1922. He replaced August Putk.

References

1885 births
1942 deaths
People from Rõuge Parish
People from Kreis Werro
Estonian Independent Socialist Workers' Party politicians
Estonian Workers' Party politicians
Members of the Riigikogu, 1920–1923
Members of the Riigikogu, 1926–1929